Acromyrmex lobicornis is a species of leaf-cutter ant, a New World ant of the subfamily Myrmicinae of the genus Acromyrmex. This species is from one of the two genera of advanced attines (fungus-growing ants) within the tribe Attini.

Subspecies
Acromyrmex lobicornis cochlearis
Acromyrmex lobicornis ferrugineus
Acromyrmex lobicornis pencosensis
Acromyrmex lobicornis pruinosior

Habitat
A. lobicornis thrives in disturbed habitats, likely due to higher concentrations of pioneer plant species. Pioneer plants have lower levels of secondary metabolites and higher nutrient concentrations than the shade-tolerant species that will come later.

See also
List of leafcutter ants

References

Acromyrmex
Insects described in 1888
Agricultural pest insects